René Guder (born 6 September 1994) is a German professional footballer who plays as a forward for ETSV Weiche

Career
Having spent the 2016–17 season at ETSV Weiche on loan from Holstein Kiel, Guder joined the fourth-tier club permanently for the 2017–18 season. In summer 2018, he joined 3. Liga side SV Wehen Wiesbaden. He made two assists in ten matches during the first half of the season. In January 2019 Guder moved to league rivals SV Meppen on a free transfer, having agreed a contract until summer 2020.

References

External links
 
 

1994 births
Living people
German footballers
Footballers from Hamburg
Association football forwards
3. Liga players
Regionalliga players
Hamburger SV II players
Holstein Kiel players
Holstein Kiel II players
SC Weiche Flensburg 08 players
SV Wehen Wiesbaden players
SV Meppen players
21st-century German people